Signals is an album by American jazz pianist Mal Waldron featuring solo performances recorded in Baarn, Holland in 1971 and released on the Freedom label.

Reception
The Allmusic review by Scott Yanow awarded the album 4 stars stating "this set features a solo outing by Waldron that fully displays his continually evolving style. He had moved away from his earlier Thelonious Monk influence to an extent and developed his own brooding style which made expert use of repetition. Waldron's four originals give him plenty of opportunity to stretch out".

Track listing
All compositions by Mal Waldron
 "Signals" — 7:38  
 "Things That Go Bump in the Night" — 8:35  
 "Zapata" — 10:30  
 "A Touch of the Blues" — 8:40 
Recorded  in Baarn, Holland on August 14, 1971.

Personnel
 Mal Waldron – piano

References

Freedom Records albums
Mal Waldron albums
1971 albums
Solo piano jazz albums